Federation of Malaya competed in the 1958 Asian Games held in Tokyo, Japan from 24 May 1958 to 1 June 1958. This country is ranked number 15 with no gold medals, no silver medals and 3 bronze medals.

Medal summary

Medals by sport

Medallists

Athletics

Men
Track event

Basketball

Men's tournament
Group B

Seventh to tenth place classification

Ranked 10th in final standings

Field hockey

Men's tournament
Final round

Ranked 4th in final standings

Football

Men's tournament
Group A

Ranked 13th in final standings

Tennis

Four tennis player represented for Malaysia in tennis.

Weightlifting

Men

Wrestling

Two wrestler represented for Malaysia in wrestling.

References

Nations at the 1958 Asian Games
1958
Asian Games